Mundo Deportivo (meaning Sports World in English) is a Spanish nationwide daily sports newspaper published in Barcelona.

History and profile
Mundo Deportivo was first published on 1 February 1906, as a weekly newspaper, and since 1929 daily. It is the oldest sports newspaper still published in Spain, and the second one in Europe, after the Italian La Gazzetta dello Sport which was founded in 1896.

It is published in Barcelona and is owned by Grupo Godó. The group also owns La Vanguardia.

Mundo Deportive focuses primarily on the performances of FC Barcelona, but also covers the Spanish basketball league (ACB), Grand Prix motorcycle racing and Formula One car racing, amongst others.

Both Mundo Deportivo and Sport are the predominant sources of sports news in Catalonia.

Notes

References

External links

Official website 

Publications established in 1906
1906 establishments in Spain
Newspapers published in Barcelona
Daily newspapers published in Spain
Spanish-language newspapers
Sports newspapers
Sports mass media in Catalonia
Sports mass media in Spain
Spanish news websites